Rättvik Church is a church building in Rättvik in Sweden. It belongs to Rättvik Parish of the Church of Sweden.

References

External links

Rattvik Church
Churches in Dalarna County